The 1970 season was the Minnesota Vikings' 10th in the National Football League and the first season following the AFL–NFL merger. Under head coach Bud Grant, they finished with a 12–2 record and won the first ever NFC Central title before losing to the San Francisco 49ers at home in the NFC Divisional Playoff game. The Vikings' defense became the second defense in the history of the NFL to lead the league in fewest points allowed and fewest total yards allowed for two consecutive seasons.

Offseason

1970 Draft

 The Vikings traded their fourth-round selection (103rd overall) to the New Orleans Saints in exchange for TE Kent Kramer.
 The Vikings traded their sixth-round selection (155th overall) to the Pittsburgh Steelers in exchange for TE Tony Jeter.

Roster

Preseason

Regular season

Schedule

Game summaries

Week 1: vs Kansas City Chiefs

Standings

Postseason

Schedule

Statistics

Team leaders

League rankings

References

Minnesota Vikings seasons
Minnesota
NFC Central championship seasons
Minnesota Vikings